Dexter Macham Patterson (born 18 August 2003) is a British racing driver from Scotland currently competing in the British Touring Car Championship with Laser Tools Racing. He was a member of the Sauber Junior Team from 2019 until early 2021.

Career

Karting 
Patterson started competition karting in 2011 at the Trent Valley Kart Club. From there he moved onto national championships, winning the Super 1 National and Formula Kart Stars series in 2015 and achieved victory at the Kartmasters British Grand Prix in 2016 in the Rotax Mini Max class. 2017 would become Patterson's most successful year to date: the Scot triumphed in the Trofeo delle Industrie and won the Karting World Championship on his first attempt. He then raced in karts for two more seasons, with a notable success being victory in the WSK Super Master Series in 2019.

Lower formulae 
In 2020 Patterson made his single-seater debut with a one-off appearance in the first round of the Formula 4 UAE Championship with Xcel Motorsport. Despite his lack of experience the Scot managed to finish all three races in the points, and ended up twelfth in the standings.

Patterson's main campaign for that season would lie in the Italian F4 Championship, where he would partner Jesse Salmenautio and fellow rookies Zdeněk Chovanec and Sebastian Øgaard at Bhaitech. He had a successful first round at Misano, where he got points in all three races, and he finished ninth in the following race at Imola. The eight points Patterson scored through the first four races would unfortunately be his only points of the season, as the team struggled with reliability. Patterson ended up 22nd in the championship, behind all of his teammates. He finished 15th in the Rookies' standings.

BRDC British F3 Championship 
For 2021 the Scot progressed into the BRDC British Formula 3 Championship, driving for Douglas Motorsport alongside Reema Juffali. His first podium came at just his third race, with third place at the Brands Hatch Circuit. The next round at Silverstone would bring controversy however, as Patterson was disqualified from the first two races and excluded from the third one after an altercation in the paddock with Bryce Aron, who had collided with the Scot in the second race. Patterson bounced back in round three at Donington Park with three top ten finishes and a best result of fourth that weekend, but would withdraw from the following round at Spa-Francorchamps. He finished the season in 21st place, being one of 19 drivers to have scored a podium throughout the campaign.

Formula Regional European Championship 
On the 20 July 2021 Monolite Racing announced that Patterson would be replacing the outgoing Jasin Ferati in the Formula Regional European Championship for the Spa-Francorchamps round. He finished the first race in 19th place, but would go on to score his first points in just his second start, finishing seventh and bringing Monolite their first points of the year.

Formula One 
In 2019 the karting division of the Sauber Junior Team signed Patterson for the Scot's final year of karting competition. When Patterson moved up to single-seaters in 2020 he was confirmed to become part of the academy. In February 2021, Patterson was released from the programme.

Racing record

Career summary

Complete Italian F4 Championship results 
(key) (Races in bold indicate pole position) (Races in italics indicate fastest lap)

Complete BRDC British Formula 3 Championship results 
(key) (Races in bold indicate pole position) (Races in italics indicate fastest lap)

Complete Formula Regional European Championship results 
(key) (Races in bold indicate pole position) (Races in italics indicate fastest lap)

Complete British Touring Car Championship results
(key) Races in bold indicate pole position (1 point awarded – 2002–2003 all races, 2004–present just in first race) Races in italics indicate fastest lap (1 point awarded all races) * signifies that driver lead race for at least one lap (1 point awarded – 2002 just in feature races, 2003–present all races)

References

External links 
 

2003 births
Living people
British racing drivers
Scottish racing drivers
BRDC British Formula 3 Championship drivers
Monolite Racing drivers
Euroformula Open Championship drivers
Italian F4 Championship drivers
Formula Regional European Championship drivers
Drivex drivers
Bhaitech drivers
British Touring Car Championship drivers
Karting World Championship drivers
UAE F4 Championship drivers
Sauber Motorsport drivers